Johannes Maria Pistorius (born 16 June 1995) is a German badminton player. Born in Roth, Bavaria, Pistorius started playing badminton at aged 5, trained at the NSP Nürnberg since 2008, and joined the TSV 1906 Freystadt in 2014. He was the bronze medalists at the 2013 European Junior Championships in the boys' doubles and mixed team event.  He graduated from Bertolt-Brecht school, and now educated at the Saarland University of Applied Sciences.

Achievements

European Junior Championships 
Boys' doubles

BWF International Challenge/Series (7 runners-up) 
Men's doubles

Mixed doubles

  BWF International Challenge tournament
  BWF International Series tournament
  BWF Future Series tournament

References

External links 
 

1995 births
Living people
People from Roth (district)
Sportspeople from Middle Franconia
German male badminton players